In 2019, it was reported that the Republic of South Africa had admitted that it been performing mass surveillance on Internet traffic by intercepting signals on submarine cables since 2008. The information emerged from a government affidavit in a legal case filed by the civil rights group amaBhungane that had challenged the Regulation of Interception of Communications Act of 2002 and the National Security Act of 1994.

References 

South Africa
Law enforcement in South Africa
Human rights abuses in South Africa